Nicole Wermers (born 1971) is a German artist, born in Emsdetten, and based in London.

Education 
Wermers studied at the Academy of Fine Arts of Hamburg (Hochschule für bildende Künste Hamburg) from 1991 to 1997 and received an MFA from Central Saint Martins College of Art and Design, University of the Arts London in 1999. She has participated in residencies at Delfina Studio Trust in London (2004) and Camden Arts Centre in London (2005), and most recently received a fellowship at Villa Massimo, the German Academy in Rome (2012).

Career
In 2015 Wermers was nominated for the Turner Prize in recognition of her exhibition Infrastruktur, originally shown at Herald St, London. Her installation Infrastruktur adopted the glossy aesthetics and materials of modernist design and high fashion, alluding to themes of lifestyle, class, consumption and control.

Collections 
The artist's works can be found in the permanent collections of Tate in London, Hamburger Kunsthalle in Hamburg, Museum für Moderne Kunst in Frankfurt, Karl-Ernst Osthaus Museum in Hagen, and as part of the DGZ Bank Collection in Düsseldorf, among others.

Awards 
In 1998-99 Wermers received the DAAD Jahresstipendium, London, 1997 Award of the Dietze Foundation, Hamburg. 

In 2015 Wermers was nominated for the Turner Prize along with Bonnie Camplin, Janice Kerbel, and Assemble.

References

1971 births
Living people
21st-century German women artists
Alumni of Central Saint Martins
German contemporary artists